Mark Dearey (born 19 March 1963) is an Irish Green Party politician who served as a Senator from 2010 to 2011, after being nominated by the Taoiseach.

Political career
Dearey was a member of Louth County Council for the Green Party. He was elected to the Dundalk Town Council in 2004 and re-elected in 2009, he was also elected to the County Council for the first time. He was re-elected to the County Council in 2014.

He was the Green Party candidate at the 2007 general election in the Louth constituency and received 7.6% of first preference votes, but was not elected. In the 2011 general election, his vote declined to 4.7% of first preference votes. In 2012, he was selected as the Green Party's Spokesperson for Finance.

He ran unsuccessfully as the Green Party candidate in the Midlands–North-West constituency for the 2014 European Parliament election and received 1.5% of the first preference votes. He was also an unsuccessful candidate in the Louth constituency at the 2016 general election. He did not contest the 2019 local elections. He contested the 2020 general election for the Green Party in Louth, but was not elected.

Background
He first came to public attention in County Louth in 1994, when he and three others from the county took a court action against British Nuclear Fuels, to seek an end to reprocessing at Sellafield.

In the early 1990s, he worked as a secondary schoolteacher in Coláiste Éanna in Dublin, before embarking on a career in organic horticulture where he worked for nine years. He then acquired the music venue and bar, The Spirit Store in Dundalk which he still owns and manages.

He is a Director of Turas, a Dundalk based, addiction counselling service. He is a founding member of the Newry Dundalk Farmers Market, Chairman of the  Dundalk St. Patrick's Day Committee, and a former board member of Friends of the Earth, Ireland.

References

1963 births
Living people
Green Party (Ireland) senators
Irish schoolteachers
Local councillors in County Louth
Members of the 23rd Seanad
People from Dundalk
Politicians from County Louth
Nominated members of Seanad Éireann
Alumni of University College Cork